The election of the president and vice president of the Republic of China is a universal direct election through secret vote by the citizens of the Republic of China (ROC) in the Taiwan Area. ROC presidents are elected by simple majority, meaning the candidate with the most votes wins without a runoff requirement. The most recent election took place on January 11, 2020.

 The Presidential and Vice Presidential Election and Recall Act states that a candidate for president or vice president must be a citizen of the Republic of China, at least 40 years old, and a resident of Taiwan for a period of no less than 15 years with a physical presence of no less than 6 consecutive months. 
 The following persons shall not be registered as candidates for the president:
 Military personnel
 Election officials
 People who hold foreign nationality or who hold residency of the People's Republic of China
 People who have restored their nationality or acquired their nationality by naturalization
The president and vice president are nominated on a joint ticket. Political parties which have gained at least 5% of the votes in the last presidential or legislative election may nominate a set of candidates directly. For example, during the 2012 elections, only the Kuomintang and Democratic Progressive Party were qualified to nominate candidates through this rule. Alternatively, candidates may be nominated by a petition signed by eligible voters numbering no less than 1.5% of the electors in the last legislative election. (This equals 252,848 signatures for the 2012 election.)

List of presidential elections in Taiwan

See also
Elections in Taiwan
President of the Republic of China
List of presidents of the Republic of China
Vice President of the Republic of China
List of vice presidents of the Republic of China
 Right of expatriates to vote in their country of origin#Taiwan

References 

 
Elections in Taiwan